Steineger is a surname. Notable people with the surname include:

Agnes Steineger (1863–1965), Norwegian painter
Chris Steineger (born 1962), American politician